USS Gillette may refer to more than one United States Navy ship:

USS Gillette (DE-270), a destroyer escort transferred to the United Kingdom upon completion which served in the Royal Navy as the frigate  from 1943 to 1945 and in the U.S. Navy briefly during 1945 as the destroyer escort USS Foley (DE-270)
, a destroyer escort in commission from 1943 to 1947

United States Navy ship names